Adhemarius gannascus is a moth of the family Sphingidae first described by Caspar Stoll in 1790.

Distribution 
It is known from Jamaica, Mexico, Belize, Guatemala, El Salvador, Honduras, Nicaragua, Costa Rica, Panama, Colombia, Ecuador, Peru, Venezuela, Guyana, Suriname, French Guiana, Bolivia, Brazil, northern Argentina, southern Paraguay and Uruguay.

Description 
The wingspan is 92–112 mm for males and 98–124 mm for females. Adults are on wing year round.

Biology 
The larvae have been recorded feeding on Ocotea veraguensis, Persea povedae, Persea americana and Damburneya salicina.

Taxonomy 
 
 Adhemarius gannascus cubanus (Rothschild & Jordan, 1908)
 Adhemarius gannascus jamaicensis (Rothschild & Jordan, 1915)

References

Adhemarius
Moths of Central America
Sphingidae of South America
Moths described in 1790